Hu Mei (born 2 September 1958) is a Chinese film director, television director and producer. Usually classed as a Fifth Generation director, since she graduated from the Directors' class of the 1982 Beijing Film Academy cohort, she is a classmate of famous Fifth Generation directors such as Chen Kaige and Tian Zhuangzhuang.

In 1997, she directed the historical television series Yongzheng Dynasty, which received critical acclaim in mainland China.  She has since directed a number of television series, including The Emperor in Han Dynasty (2005), Qiao's Grand Courtyard (2006), and Cao Cao (2014).

In 2007, she was originally selected to direct a television series adaptation of the Chinese classical novel A Dream of the Red Chamber but withdrew from the job (she was replaced by Li Shaohong). Her 2010 film Confucius, starring Chow Yun-fat as the eponymous character, was released in Beijing on 14 January 2010.

Life 
Hu was an actress in the Modern Drama Troupe of the General Political Division of the People's Liberation Army. Her father was a conductor and mother was a singer. Hu was trained to play the piano from a very young age. When the Beijing Film Academy reopened in 1978, she enrolled for the directing class under her father's encouragement.

After graduation in 1982, she was assigned to the Bayi Film Studio. In 1984, she made her first film Women's Chamber (女儿楼, Nü'er Lou). Two years later, her film Times Away from War (远离战争的年代, Yuanli Zhanzheng de Niandai), which is said to be the first Chinese psychological film, won her a number of international awards.

Hu nearly went to France to pursue a Ph.D. in film, but abandoned the idea at the last minute. She spent nearly ten years shooting television commercials. She also started directing more commercialized films. Yongzheng Dynasty was her first major successful television series. Since then, she is considered a top-tiered television series director in China.

In 2019, Hu won the Best Director award for Enter The Forbidden City at the Chinese American Film Festival in Los Angeles.

References

Further reading

External links 
 

1958 births
Living people
Beijing Film Academy alumni
Film directors from Beijing
Chinese women film directors